Ponnammangalam is a village that is located in the administrative division of Arcot taluk in Vellore district of the Indian state of Tamil Nadu.

Cities and towns in Vellore district